Jabłonów may refer to the following places in Poland:
Jabłonów, Lower Silesian Voivodeship (south-west Poland)
Jabłonów, Łódź Voivodeship (central Poland)
Jabłonów, Masovian Voivodeship (east-central Poland)
Jabłonów, Lubusz Voivodeship (west Poland)

See also
Yabluniv (Polish: Jabłonów), Ukraine